James Charles Hindmarsh (born 11 April 1952) was a rugby union player who represented Australia, then latterly played the 1977–78 season rugby league for Penrith.

Hindmarsh, a fullback, was born in Bowral, New South Wales and schooled at The Scots College in Sydney. He claimed a total of 9 international rugby caps for Australia.

After that he played reserve grade in the NSWRFL Premiership for the Penrith Panthers club.

References

Bibliography
 Howell, Max (2005) Born to Lead - Wallaby Test Captains, Celebrity Books, Auckland NZ

1952 births
Living people
Australia international rugby union players
Australian rugby league players
Australian rugby union players
Penrith Panthers players
People educated at Scots College (Sydney)
Rugby league players from New South Wales
Rugby union players from New South Wales
Rugby union fullbacks